Ahmed Atari (born 2 May 1994) is a Qatari swimmer.

At the 2011 World Aquatics Championships in Shanghai, Atari placed 34th in the 50 m backstroke heats with a time of 32.37 seconds and in the 400 m individual medley heats with a time of 5:16.80. The qualifying times were 25.98 and 4:24.77, respectively. At the short course 2010 FINA World Swimming Championships in Dubai, he placed 92nd in the 50 m freestyle heats with a time of 25.45 seconds.

Atari made his Olympic debut in 2012. Although he did not meet the Olympic qualifying time (4:16.46) or invitation time (4:25.44), he was permitted a wild card entry. The wild cards are designed to admit swimmers from developing nations that do not have swimmers who are able to meet the qualifying standards for a particular event. He finished last in the 400 m individual medley heats with a time of 5:21:30.

References

External links
 

Qatari male swimmers
Living people
Olympic swimmers of Qatar
Swimmers at the 2012 Summer Olympics
Male medley swimmers
1994 births
Swimmers at the 2010 Asian Games
Asian Games competitors for Qatar